Omen is the ninth studio album from German futurepop band Blutengel. It was released as a single CD, 2xCD digipack with a bonus disc, and a collectors edition box set with the 2xCD album and an EP entitled Dark & Pure Volume 2 featuring stripped down piano & guitar acoustic versions of songs from Omen, arranged and performed by Conrad Oleak with Chris and Ulrike.

Omen was preceded by two singles, Asche zu Asche and Sing, both with accompanying music videos directed by Carlo Roberti.

Due to a legal dispute, its title had to be changed and got a re-release in 2016 under the new name Save Us.

Track listing

References
 

2015 albums
Blutengel albums